is an upcoming Japanese animated film produced by Studio Trigger. The anime film is set in the Gridman Universe that is originally created by Tsuburaya Productions, and features characters from SSSS.Gridman and SSSS.Dynazenon. The film is scheduled to be released on March 24, 2023.

Voice cast

Production and release
The film was initially announced as the next Gridman Universe project following the first run end of SSSS.Dynazenon. In December 2021, Tsuburaya Productions and Studio Trigger revealed that the project would be an anime film. The film features returning staff, including director Akira Amemiya, scriptwriter Keiichi Hasegawa, character designer Masaru Sakamoto, and composer Shiro Sagisu, with Studio Trigger, who produced the film's two pre-sequels, SSSS.Gridman in 2018 and SSSS.Dynazenon in 2021, remains to animate the film. The film is set to premiere in Japan on March 24, 2023. Masayoshi Ōishi will perform the theme song "uni-verse". Prior to the premiere of the film, SSSS.Gridman and SSSS.Dynazenon would each receive a compilation film on January 20, 2023 and March 10, 2023 respectively.

References

External links
 

2023 anime films
Animated crossover films
Animated films based on animated television series
Anime with original screenplays
Kaiju films
Mecha anime and manga
Mecha films
Studio Trigger